In telecommunication, bit pairing is the practice of establishing, within a code set, a number of subsets that have an identical bit representation except for the state of a specified bit.  

Note:  An example of bit pairing occurs in the International Alphabet No. 5 and the American Standard Code for Information Interchange (ASCII), where the upper case letters are related to their respective lower case letters by the state of bit six.

References 

Data transmission